Darnell Henry Savage Jr. (born July 30, 1997) is an American football free safety for the Green Bay Packers of the National Football League (NFL). He played college football at Maryland, and was drafted by the Packers in the first round of the 2019 NFL Draft.

Early years
Savage attended Caravel Academy in Bear, Delaware. He suffered a broken femur during the first game of his junior season. Savage committed to the University of Maryland to play college football.

College career
Savage played at Maryland from 2015 to 2018. During his career, he had 182 tackles, eight interceptions, one sack and two touchdowns.

Professional career

Savage was drafted by the Green Bay Packers with the 21st overall pick in the first round of the 2019 NFL Draft. On May 2, 2019, Savage signed a 4-year deal worth $12.5 million, including a signing bonus of $7.1 million.

2019

Savage made his NFL debut in the Packers' season opener against the Chicago Bears on September 5, 2019, recording three tackles and one pass deflection.
In week 3 against the Denver Broncos, Savage recorded his first career interception off Joe Flacco as the Packers won 27–16.

2020
In Week 12 against the Chicago Bears on Sunday Night Football, Savage intercepted two passes thrown by Mitchell Trubisky during the 41–25 win.

2022
The Packers picked up the fifth-year option on Savage's contract on April 29, 2022. On January 1, 2023, during a Week 17 victory over the Minnesota Vikings, Savage intercepted a pass thrown by Kirk Cousins and returned it 75 yards for his first NFL touchdown.

NFL career statistics

Regular season

Postseason

References

External links
Green Bay Packers bio
Maryland Terrapins bio

1997 births
Living people
People from Salisbury, Maryland
Players of American football from Maryland
American football safeties
American football cornerbacks
Maryland Terrapins football players
Green Bay Packers players